Harold George "Hal" Cogger (born 4 May 1935) is an Australian herpetologist. He was curator of reptiles and amphibians at the Australian Museum from 1960 to 1975, and Deputy Director of the museum from 1976 to 1995. He has written extensively on Australian herpetology, and was the first author to create a field guide for all Australian frogs and reptiles.

Cogger was made an honorary Doctor of Science in 1997. At least eight reptile taxa have been named after Cogger, including one genus, six species, and one subspecies: Coggeria, Ctenotus coggeri, Emoia coggeri, Geomyersia coggeri, Hydrophis coggeri, Lampropholis coggeri, Oedura coggeri, and Diporiphora nobbi coggeri.

References

External links

Further reading
Cogger, Harold G. (1983). Reptiles and Amphibians of Australia, Revised Edition. Sydney: AH & AW Reed. 606 pp.  [1979 and subsequent editions].
Cogger, Harold G. (2014). Reptiles and Amphibians of Australia, Seventh Edition. Clayton, Victoria, Australia: CSIRO Publishing. xxx + 1,033 pp. .

Living people
Australian zoologists
Australian herpetologists
1935 births